The International Naturist Federation (INF) or Fédération naturiste internationale (FNI) or Internationalen Naturisten Föderation (INF) is the global umbrella organisation representing official national naturist societies.

Membership
The INF is made up of representatives of national naturist organisations. The rules of the federation limit membership to one national society. To by-pass this rule, the French and English-speaking Canadian societies formed a partnership for the purpose of participating in the INF.

Some federations have independent youth organisations which are currently not affiliated to the INF directly. On European level, youth representatives (European Naturist Youth – ENY) have elected a Youth committee to speak towards the INF and the European Naturist Assembly (EuNat). Its task is to coordinate events and promote communication and exchange between young naturists.

The rules of INF provide for direct membership in the INF if there is no affiliated national naturist organisation in the country of residence.

Affiliated national organisations

The INF currently represents the following organisations:

Africa
South Africa – South African National Naturist Association

Asia
India – Indian Naturist Federation
Israel – עמותה ישראלית לנטוריזם (Israel Naturist Society) 
Taiwan – Taiwan Naturist Society
Thailand – เนเชอริสท์ แอสโซซิเอชั่น ไทยแลนด์ (Naturist Association Thailand)

Europe
Austria – Österreichischer Naturistenverband 
Belgium – Federatie van Belgische Naturisten / Fédération Belge de Naturisme 
Bulgaria – Union der Naturisten in Bulgarien (Съюз на нудисти в България, Sajuz na nudisti v Balgarija) 
Croatia – Drustvo Naturista Hrvatske 
Czech – Frantisek Hájek 
Denmark – Dansk Naturist Union 
Finland – Suomen Naturistiliitto ry 
France – Fédération française de naturisme (in French)
Germany – Deutscher Verband für Freikörperkultur (DFK) (German Association for Free Body Culture)
Greece – Ελλήνων Γυμνιστών-Φυσιολατρών "Γυμνοκρατία"
Hungary – Naturisták Magyarországi Szövetsége (NAMASZ) (Federation of Naturists in Hungary, FENHU)
Ireland – Irish Naturist Association 
Italy – Federazione Naturista Italiana 
Lithuania – Korespondentas Lietuvoje (correspondent in Lithuania) 
Luxembourg – Fédération Luxembourgeoise de Naturisme 
Netherlands –  (in Dutch) (NFN) 
Norway – Norsk Naturistforbund 
Poland – Federacja Naturystów Polskich 
Portugal – Federação Portuguesa de Naturismo 
Romania - Asociatia RoNaturism
Russia – Федерация натуристов "Телорд" (Federacija naturistov "Telord") 
Serbia – Naturisticka Ogranizacija Srbije (Naturist Organisation of Serbia, SRB)
Spain – Federación Española de Naturismo 
Slovakia – Asociácia slovenských naturistov (ASN) 
Slovenia –  Zveza Drustev Naturistov Slovenije
Sweden – Sveriges Naturistförbund 
Switzerland – Union Naturiste Suisse/Schweizer Naturisten Union/Unione Naturista 
United Kingdom – British Naturism formerly Central Council for British Naturism

North America
Canada – Union of the Quebec and Canadian Naturist Federations / Union des Fédérrations Québécoise et Canadienne de Naturisme (Canadian union of Federation of Canadian Naturists (FCN) and Fédération Québécoise de Naturisme (FQN))
Dominican Republic – Union naturista de republica Dominiciana
Mexico – Federacion Nudista de México
United States – None (since the September 2010 withdrawal of the American Association for Nude Recreation)

South America
Argentina – Espacio de Encuentro Naturista 
Brazil – Federação Brasileira de Naturismo 
Chile – Agrupación Naturista de Chile (ANACHI) 
Uruguay – Asociación Uruguaya Nudista Naturista

Australia/Oceania
Australia – Australian Naturist Federation 
New Zealand – None, since the 2019 withdrawal of the New Zealand Naturist Federation Inc.

World Congress
The World Congress of the INF have been held in the following cities. World Congresses were organized prior to the founding of the INF. At the 1953 World Congress the INF was officially created. All World Congresses after 1953 were organized by the INF.
1951 – London, England 
1952 – Thielle, Switzerland
1953 – CHM Montalivet, France
1954 – Vienna, Austria
1956 – Hanover, Germany
1958 – Woburn Abbey, Great Britain
1960 – Solbacken, Malmö, Denmark
1962 - BffL Hanover, Germany
1964 – Héliomonde, Saint-Chéron, Essonne( near Paris), France
1966 – Athena Antwerpen, Ossendrecht, Netherlands
1968 – Penn Sylvan, Mohnton, Pennsylvania, USA
1970 – North Kent Sun Club, Orpington, Great Britain
1972 – Koversada (Vrsar), Croatia
1974 – Cap d'Agde, Sérignan, France
1976 – Naturistenbund Rhein-Main, Wiesbaden, Germany
1978 – South Hants Country Club, Fareham, England
1980 – Flevo-Natuur, Netherlands
1982 – Cypress Cove, Kissimmee, Florida, USA
1984 – Costa Natura, Estepona, Spain
1986 – Sportbund Sonnland e.V., Freiburg im Breisgau, Germany
1988 – Monsena (Rovinj), Yugoslavia
1990 – Natur und Sport, Zürich, Switzerland
1992 – Paradise Lakes, Tampa, Florida, USA
1994 – Rutar Lido KG, Eberndorf, Austria
1996 – Athena Antwerpen, Ossendrecht, Netherlands
1998 – Galaxen, Sweden
2000 – BffL, Hanover, Germany
2002 – Cypress Cove, Kissimmee, Florida, USA
2004 – Valalta, Rovinj, Croatia
2006 – El Portus (Cartagena), Spain
2008 – Tambaba Beach, Brazil
2010 – Pizzo Greco, Isola di Capo Rizzuto, Italy
2012 – Koversada (Vrsar), Croatia
2014 – Drumshanbo, Ireland
2016 – Wellington Naturist Club, New Zealand
2017 – Vienna, Austria (special meeting)
2018 – Lisbon, Portugal
2021 – Veržej, Slovenia (delayed until 2021 due to the COVID-19 pandemic)
2022 – Luxembourg

Presidents 
List of INF presidents (also member of the executive committee and Central Committee) 
Richard Ehrmann-Falkenau (Austria) 1953 – 1956
Erik Holm (Denmark) 1956 – 1964
Gilbert Sarrou (France) 1964 – 1968
Michel Caillaud (France) 1968 – 1976
Frans Mollaert (Belgium) 1976 – 1980
Alan McCombe (Great Britain) 1980 – 1988
Bart Wijnberg (Netherlands) 1988 – 1995
Karl Josef Dreßen (Germany) 1995 – 2000
Wolfgang Weinreich (Germany) 2000 – 2007
George Volak (USA) 2007 – 2008
Sieglinde Ivo (Austria) 2008 – 2016
Armand Jamier (France) 2016 (Election annulled by the INF Legal Commission) 
Sieglinde Ivo (Austria) 2017 – 2021
Sieglinde Ivo (Austria) and Stéphane Deschênes (Canada) as co-presidents 2021 – present

See also

Clothing-optional bike rides
List of public outdoor clothes free places
List of social nudity organizations
Naturism
Nudity
Public nudity
Skinny dipping
Timeline of social nudity

References

External links

Clothing free organizations
Naturism
Organizations established in 1953
Federations